Christopher David Matthew Stalford (17 January 1983 – 19 February 2022) was a Northern Irish politician who was a Democratic Unionist Party (DUP) Member of the Northern Ireland Assembly (MLA) for South Belfast from the 2016 election until his death in 2022.

Biography
Stalford was born in the Annadale Flats in south Belfast, on 17 January 1983. He studied nearby at Wellington College Belfast and Queen's University Belfast. After graduation he worked in the European office of Jim Allister three days a week, and the office of Peter Weir two days a week. He then moved to the DUP press office for six years and then onto the policy unit.

At the 2005 local elections, he was elected to Belfast City Council, representing the Laganbank area

At the 2014 local elections, Laganbank was abolished and he was re-elected for the Balmoral area.

Stalford served as High Sheriff of Belfast in 2010. Aged only 27, the Belfast Telegraph described him as the youngest ever High Sheriff of the city. He was elected as Deputy Lord Mayor for the 2013–14 term.

In 2008 he was selected as the chairman of the Belfast District Policing Partnership.

At the 2016 Northern Ireland Assembly election, he was one of two DUP candidates elected in South Belfast.

Death
Stalford died suddenly on 19 February 2022, at the age of 39. While Stalford was described as "unionist to the core", his funeral was attended by a range of political parties including Sinn Féin colleagues John O'Dowd and Deirdre Hargey, SDLP MP Claire Hanna and Alliance Party leader Naomi Long.

When Edwin Poots was elected to Stalford's former constituency of Belfast South at the 2022 Assembly election, he paid tribute to Stalford and pledged to "build a legacy for Christopher".

References

1983 births
2022 deaths
Alumni of Queen's University Belfast
Democratic Unionist Party MLAs
High Sheriffs of Belfast
Members of Belfast City Council
Northern Ireland MLAs 2016–2017
Northern Ireland MLAs 2017–2022
People educated at Wellington College Belfast
Politicians from Belfast